The NGC 4065 Group is a group of galaxies located about  in the constellation Coma Berenices. The group's brightest member is NGC 4065 and located in the Coma Supercluster.

The group is dominated by mostly elliptical galaxies with only 15 to 31 percent of the members being spiral galaxies.

X-ray emission
The NGC 4065 Group exhibits bimodal X-ray emission with one peak on the galaxies NGC 4061 and NGC 4065 and the other on NGC 4066.

Structure 
The NGC 4065 Group appears to consist of two subgroups known as UZC-CG 156 and UZC-CG 157 which are indistinguishable by velocity. 
 
However, White et al. suggests that the group contains three subgroups with subgroups A and C being centered on NGC 4065 and NGC 4095 respectively, and subgroup B which consists of the galaxies NGC 4086 and NGC 4090.

At the center of the group lie the elliptical galaxies NGC 4061 and NGC 4065.

Nearby groups
The NGC 4065 Group is located near the Leo Cluster and is part of a bridge of galaxies that connects the Leo Cluster to the Coma Cluster.

See also
 NGC 4065
 Leo Cluster
 Coma Cluster
 List of Galaxy Groups

References

External links
Finding Chart for the NGC 4065 Group

 
Coma Supercluster
Coma Berenices
Galaxy clusters